The women's 100 metres freestyle at the 2018 World Para Swimming European Championships was held at the National Aquatic Centre in Dublin from 13–19 August.  9 classification finals are held in all over this event.

Medalists

See also
List of IPC world records in swimming

References

100 metres freestyle